The 1975 Isle of Man TT was the sixth round of the 1975 Grand Prix motorcycle racing season. It took place on the weekend of 4–6 June 1975 at the Snaefell Mountain Course.

500cc classification

References

Isle of Man TT
Isle of Man TT
Isle of Man TT